Bruno Rosas Martini (born 18 April 1987) is a Brazilian double-mini and tumbling trampoline gymnast, representing his nation at international competitions. At the 2008 Pan American Trampoline and Tumbling Championships he won two silver medal and at the  2010 Pan American Trampoline and Tumbling Championships a gold and a silver medal. He competed at world championships, including at the 2009, 2011 and 2013 Trampoline World Championships, winning the silver medal in 2011 the double-mini team event. At the 2013 World Games he won the gold medal in the individual event.

References

External links
 

1987 births
Living people
Brazilian male trampolinists
Place of birth missing (living people)
World Games gold medalists
Competitors at the 2013 World Games
Medalists at the Trampoline Gymnastics World Championships
Competitors at the 2009 World Games